The 1996 United States presidential election in Wyoming took place on November 5, 1996, as part of the 1996 United States presidential election. Voters chose three representatives, or electors to the Electoral College, who voted for president and vice president.

Wyoming was won by Senator Bob Dole (R-KS), with Dole winning 49.81 percent to 36.84 percent over President Bill Clinton (D) by a margin of 12.97 points. Billionaire businessman Ross Perot (Independent-TX) finished in third, with 12.25 percent of the popular vote.

With 12.25 percent of the popular vote, Wyoming would prove to be Perot's fourth-strongest state in the 1996 election after Maine, Montana and Idaho. This is the last time a Democrat won any counties other than Albany or Teton counties. , this remains the last time that Sweetwater County has voted for a Democratic presidential candidate, as well as the last time that a Republican failed to win a majority of the state's vote, or won by a margin of less than 30 points.

Results

Results by county

See also
 United States presidential elections in Wyoming
 Presidency of Bill Clinton

Notes

References

Wyoming
1996
1996 Wyoming elections